Joel Hans Embiid (born 16 March 1994) is a Cameroonian professional basketball player for the Philadelphia 76ers of the National Basketball Association (NBA), who also holds French and American citizenship. After one year of college basketball with the Kansas Jayhawks, he was drafted third overall by the 76ers in the 2014 NBA draft. Multiple foot and knee injuries delayed his debut for two seasons until 2016–17, when he was named to the NBA All-Rookie First Team despite playing only 31 games. 

Embiid is a six-time NBA All-Star, a four-time member of the All-NBA Team and a three-time member of the All-Defensive Team. He has nicknamed himself "the Process" in response to a refrain from 76ers fans during the Sam Hinkie era to "trust the process". Embiid led the NBA in scoring during the 2021–22 season, becoming the first center and seven footer to do so since Shaquille O'Neal (2000), and was also the first center since Moses Malone (1982) to average over 30 points per game, while also being the first foreign player to lead the NBA in scoring.

Early life
Embiid was born in Yaoundé, Cameroon, to military officer Thomas Embiid and his wife, Christine. He played volleyball and soccer in childhood and originally planned to play professional volleyball in Europe but started playing basketball at age 15, modeling his game after NBA Hall of Fame center Hakeem Olajuwon. Embiid was discovered at a basketball camp by Luc Mbah a Moute, a fellow native of Yaoundé and an NBA player. With Mbah a Moute as his mentor, Embiid moved to the United States at age 16 to devote himself to becoming a professional basketball player.

Embiid enrolled at Montverde Academy, Mbah a Moute's alma mater, but transferred after his first year due to a lack of playing time. He then attended The Rock School, a Christian academy, in Gainesville, Florida. As a senior, he led their team to a 33–4 record and state championship, averaging 13.0 points, 9.7 rebounds, and 1.9 blocks per game.

Embiid was a five-star recruit according to Rivals.com and committed to Kansas in November 2012.

College career

Embiid attended the University of Kansas for one year. On 13 February 2014, he was named one of the 30 finalists for the Naismith College Player of the Year. In 2013–14, he played 28 games, averaging 11.2 points, 8.1 rebounds, 1.4 assists, and 2.6 blocks in 23.1 minutes per game. He had over 15 points in seven games and over 5 blocks in six games. He subsequently earned Big 12 Defensive Player of the Year honors and was named second-team All-Big 12.

Embiid suffered a stress fracture in his back in March 2014. He missed that year's Big 12 tournament and NCAA tournament. Kansas lost in the second round (round of 32) of the NCAA tournament.

Professional career

2014 NBA draft
On 9 April 2014, Embiid declared for the 2014 NBA draft, forgoing his final three years of college eligibility. On 20 June 2014, he underwent surgery on a broken navicular bone in his right foot, and was subsequently ruled out for four to six months. Six days later, he was selected with the third overall pick by the Philadelphia 76ers. That selection made him the third Cameroonian-born NBA player after Ruben Boumtje-Boumtje and Luc Mbah a Moute, as well as the highest selected player from Cameroon.

Philadelphia 76ers (2014–present)

Injury-plagued seasons (2014–2016)

On 26 August 2014, Embiid signed his rookie scale contract with the 76ers. He was later ruled unlikely to play at all in the 2014–15 season due to the broken navicular bone in his foot. After missing the entire 2014–15 season, it was announced on 13 June 2015 that Embiid had suffered a setback in his recovery after a CT scan revealed less healing than anticipated. It was later determined that Embiid's chances of playing in the 2015–16 season were slim following a second round of surgery on his right foot on 18 August 2015. He missed the entire 2015–16 season.

2016–17 season: All-Rookie honors
On 4 October 2016, Embiid started at center in the 76ers' first preseason game against the Boston Celtics. In his first action, he recorded six points, four rebounds, and two blocks in 13 minutes en route to a 92–89 victory. On 26 October 2016, Embiid made his long-awaited NBA regular-season debut in the 76ers' season opener against the Oklahoma City Thunder. In 25 minutes as the starting center, he recorded 20 points, seven rebounds and two blocks in a 103–97 loss. On 1 November, he recorded his first career double-double with 18 points and 10 rebounds in a 103–101 loss to the Orlando Magic. On 11 November, his 25-point effort helped the 76ers claim their first win of the season, defeating the Indiana Pacers 109–105. On 19 November, he scored a then-career high 26 points in 20 minutes in a 120–105 win over the Phoenix Suns. On 1 December, he was named Eastern Conference Rookie of the Month for games played in October and November. On 18 December, he set a new career high with 33 points in a 108–107 win over the Brooklyn Nets. On 3 January 2017, he was named Eastern Conference Rookie of the Month for games played in December.

On 11 January 2017, Embiid grabbed a then-career high 14 rebounds in a 98–97 win over the New York Knicks. On 23 January, he was named Eastern Conference Player of the Week for games played Monday, 16 January through Sunday, 22 January. Two days later, he was named in the World Team for the 2017 Rising Stars Challenge. On 2 February 2017, he was named Eastern Conference Rookie of the Month for games played in January, while also being named a Taco Bell Skills Challenge participant. On 11 February 2017, it was revealed that Embiid had a torn meniscus in his left knee, but that surgery would not be required. As a result of the injury, Embiid was ruled out of the All-Star Weekend festivities. After initially ruling him out indefinitely on 27 February with swelling in his left knee, the 76ers issued a statement two days later announcing that Embiid would miss the rest of the 2016–17 season, an MRI on his left knee having revealed that the area affected by the bone bruise had improved significantly while the previously identified meniscus tear appeared more pronounced. On 24 March 2017, he underwent successful minor arthroscopic surgery to address the meniscus tear in his left knee. At the season's end, he was named to the NBA All-Rookie First Team.

2017–18 season: First All-Star and All-NBA appearances
On 10 October 2017, Embiid signed a five-year, $148 million designated rookie scale maximum contract extension with the 76ers, with the ability to earn an additional $30 million if he earns an All-NBA first-, second- or third-team selection, or is named MVP in 2017–18. In the 76ers' season opener against the Washington Wizards on 18 October, Embiid had 18 points and 13 rebounds in a 120–115 loss. Five days later, he scored 30 points in a 97–86 win over the Detroit Pistons. On 30 October, he had 22 points, nine rebounds, five assists, and two steals in 25 minutes in a 115–107 win over the Houston Rockets, becoming just the third player to post such numbers in 25 minutes of play or less since 1983–84, joining Pau Gasol (2015) and Fat Lever (1990). On 15 November, Embiid scored a then-career high 46 points—the most by a Philadelphia player in 11 years—and grabbed 15 rebounds in a 115–109 win over the Los Angeles Lakers. Embiid also had seven assists and seven blocked shots, making him the first NBA player with 40 points, seven assists and seven blocks in a game since Julius Erving against the Pistons in 1982. Embiid shot 14 for 20 from the field and 16 of 19 at the free throw line, giving him the most points by a Sixers player since Allen Iverson scored 46 against the Chicago Bulls in 2006. In addition, the previous 35 times someone scored at least 44 for the 76ers, it was Iverson.

On 18 January, he was named a starter for the 2018 NBA All-Star Game, becoming the first Philadelphia player selected as an All-Star starter since Allen Iverson in the 2009–10 season, and the first Sixers All-Star since Jrue Holiday in 2013. Later that day, he scored 26 points and matched a then-career best with 16 rebounds in an 89–80 win over the Boston Celtics. He was subsequently named Eastern Conference Player of the Week for games played between Monday, 15 January and Sunday, 21 January. On 10 February, he had 29 points and tied a then-career high with 16 rebounds in a 112–98 win over the Los Angeles Clippers. Two days later, he was named Eastern Conference Player of the Week for games played between Monday, 5 February and Sunday, 11 February. On 15 March, he scored 29 points in a 118–110 win over the New York Knicks, becoming the first Sixers player to notch 40 20-point performances in a season since Andre Iguodala in 2007–08. A day later, on his 24th birthday, Embiid had 24 points and a then-career high 19 rebounds in a 120–116 win over the Brooklyn Nets. On 28 March against the Knicks, Embiid suffered an orbital fracture of his left eye. He underwent surgery three days later, with a two-week return date the likely outcome.

After missing the first two games of the 76ers' first-round playoff series against the Miami Heat with the left eye injury, Embiid made his playoff debut in Game 3 on 19 April. He helped the 76ers take a 2–1 lead in the series with a 128–108 win behind his 23 points. Embiid helped the 76ers move on to the second round of the playoffs with a 4–1 defeat of the Heat, as he recorded 19 points and 12 rebounds in a 104–91 win in Game 5. In Game 1 of the 76ers' second-round series against the Celtics, Embiid recorded 31 points and 13 rebounds in a 117–101 loss. The 76ers went on to lose to the Celtics in five games, with Embiid recording 27 points and 12 rebounds in a 114–112 loss in Game 5. Embiid said in his postgame press conference after Game 5 that he felt there should have been a foul called on his potential game-tying layup attempt with under 20 seconds left. The NBA later confirmed that a foul should have been called on the play.

2018–19 season: Playoff disappointment
On 24 October 2018, Embiid had 30 points and 19 rebounds in a 123–108 loss to the Milwaukee Bucks, becoming the franchise's first player to reach those marks in the same game since Charles Barkley did so in November 1991. On 27 October, he had 27 points and 14 rebounds in a 105–103 win over the Charlotte Hornets, thus registering a double-double in all six games to start the season. He became one of seven players with 2,000 points, 1,000 rebounds, and 200 blocks in his first 100 games, joining Tim Duncan, Shaquille O'Neal, Alonzo Mourning, David Robinson, Hakeem Olajuwon, and Ralph Sampson. On 1 November, he had 41 points and 13 rebounds in a 122–113 win over the Los Angeles Clippers. Two days later, he recorded 39 points and 17 rebounds in a 109–99 win over the Detroit Pistons. Thirty-two of his 39 points came in the first half, the highest for a Sixer since Allen Iverson had 33 points in the first half on 18 December 2004 against the Milwaukee Bucks. On 9 November, he recorded 42 points and 18 rebounds in a 133–132 overtime win over the Hornets. On 14 November, he recorded his first career triple-double with 19 points, 13 rebounds and 10 assists in a 111–106 loss to the Orlando Magic. On 14 December, he recorded 40 points and 21 rebounds in a 113–101 loss to the Indiana Pacers, becoming the first Sixers player with at least 30 points and 20 rebounds in a game since Barkley on 7 December 1990. On 2 January, he matched his season high with 42 points, including 30 in the first half, and grabbed 18 rebounds in a 132–127 win over the Phoenix Suns. On 10 March, he returned from an eight-game absence with a sore left knee and recorded 33 points and 12 rebounds in a 106–89 win over the Pacers. On 17 March, he had 40 points and 15 rebounds in a 130–125 win over the Bucks. On 20 March, Embiid scored 37 points and had a career-high 22 rebounds in a 118–115 win over the Boston Celtics. On 28 March, he had 39 points, 13 rebounds, and six assists in a 123–110 win over the Brooklyn Nets. On 4 April, he returned from a three-game absence and had 34 points, 13 rebounds, 13 assists, and three blocks in a 128–122 loss to the Bucks. He joined Wilt Chamberlain as the only other big man in team history with multiple triple-doubles in the same season. Embiid finished the season missing 14 games after the All-Star break, including five of the final seven games, due to rest and injury. In Game 4 of the 76ers' first-round playoff series against the Nets, Embiid had 31 points, 16 rebounds, seven assists, and six blocks in a 112–108 win. Embiid battled through illness and flu-like symptoms during the second round of the playoffs, which the Sixers lost in seven games to the Toronto Raptors.

2019–20 season: First round exit
On 31 October 2019, Embiid was suspended for two games without pay due to an altercation with Karl-Anthony Towns during a game against the Minnesota Timberwolves. On 25 November, Embiid grabbed a game-high 13 rebounds but went scoreless in an NBA game for the first time in his career in the 76ers' 101–96 loss to the Toronto Raptors. On 20 February 2020, Embiid scored a then season-high 39 points, along with 16 rebounds, to lead Philadelphia to a 112–104 overtime win against the Brooklyn Nets. Four days later, Embiid scored a then-career high 49 points and recorded 14 rebounds in a 129–112 win against the Atlanta Hawks. On 1 August, Embiid scored 41 points, as well as 21 rebounds, in a 127–121 loss to the Indiana Pacers. This was the 76ers’ first game in the Orlando bubble, returning from a four-month hiatus due to the COVID-19 pandemic. In the playoffs, the Sixers were eliminated in the first round despite Embiid averaging a playoff career-high 30 points per game.

2020–21 season: MVP runner-up
On 20 February 2021, Embiid recorded a double-double with a then-career high 50 points and 17 rebounds in the 76ers' 112–105 win against the Chicago Bulls. Embiid finished the regular season with a then career-high 28.5 points, 10.6 rebounds, and 2.8 assists in 51 games played, leading the Sixers to the best record in the Eastern Conference. He was second in NBA Most Valuable Player Award voting. On 8 June, Embiid had a playoff career-high 40 points alongside 13 rebounds, in a second round win against the Atlanta Hawks. Philadelphia would go on to lose to Atlanta in seven games despite Embiid averaging 30.4 points, 12.7 rebounds, and 3.9 assists.

2021–22 season: First scoring title

On 17 August 2021, Embiid signed a four-year, $196 million extension with the 76ers. Embiid missed nine games due to testing positive for COVID-19. In his first game back, he scored 42 points and recorded 14 rebounds in a 121–120 double overtime loss against the Minnesota Timberwolves. On 6 December, Embiid scored 43 points, grabbed 15 rebounds, and dished out seven assists on 15-of-20 shooting from the field in a 127–124 overtime win over the Charlotte Hornets.

On 19 January 2022, Embiid matched his then-career high of 50 points, along with 12 rebounds, and three blocks on 17-for-23 shooting from the field, in a 123–110 win over the Orlando Magic. On 12 February, Embiid logged his fourth career triple-double with 40 points, 14 rebounds, 10 assists, and three steals in a 103–93 win over the Cleveland Cavaliers. He became the first Sixers player with a 40-point triple-double since Wilt Chamberlain in 1968. On 17 February, Embiid had 42 points, 14 rebounds, and five assists in a 123–120 win over the reigning champions Milwaukee Bucks. On 9 April, Embiid had 41 points, a season-high 20 rebounds, four assists and two steals on 14-of-17 shooting from the field in a 133–120 win over the Indiana Pacers. Since the introduction of shot clock in 1954–55, Embiid became the fifth player in NBA history to score at least 40 points and grab 20 rebounds while shooting 80 percent or better from the field, joining former NBA All-Star John Drew and Hall of Famers Charles Barkley, Wilt Chamberlain, and Bob Pettit. At the end of the regular season, Embiid was named the NBA scoring champion, becoming the first center to do so since Shaquille O'Neal in 2000, and also the first center to average over 30 points per game since Moses Malone in 1982. Embiid also became the first foreign player to win an NBA scoring title and the first Sixer to lead the league in scoring since Allen Iverson won the title for the fourth and final time in 2005.

On 18 April, during Game 2 of the first round of the playoffs, Embiid recorded a double-double of 31 points and 11 rebounds in a 112–97 win over the Toronto Raptors. On April 20, during Game 3 of the first round, Embiid scored a game-winning three-pointer with under 1 second left in overtime against the Raptors. He finished the game with 33 points and 13 rebounds. During that game, Embiid injured his thumb and was relegated to a soft cast for the second half of the game and during the following Friday practice. After the game it was reported that he was experiencing "pain and discomfort".  Although Embiid played through the pain in Game 4 and scored 21 points and had eight rebounds, the 76ers fell to the Toronto Raptors in a 110–102 loss. It was later reported that Embiid would require surgery on the thumb, but that he would postpone the surgery until the end of the 76ers' season. On 28 April, Embiid had 33 points, 10 rebounds, and three blocks to lead the 76ers to a 132–97 win in Game 6 to end their first round series. The next day, the Sixers announced that Embiid had suffered a mild concussion and a right orbital fracture and would be out indefinitely. The injuries occurred in the fourth quarter of Game 6, when power forward Pascal Siakam hit Embiid while driving to the basketball net. Because of the injury, Embiid missed the first two games of the Eastern Conference Semifinals where Philadelphia would go on to lose to Miami in six games.

On May 30, Embiid underwent right thumb surgery and a procedure on his left index finger.

2022–23 season 
On November 13, 2022, Embiid scored a career-high 59 points along with 11 rebounds, eight assists, and seven blocks in a 105–98 victory over the Utah Jazz, with 26 points and five blocks coming in the fourth quarter. He became the first player in NBA history with 50 points, 10 boards, five assists and five blocks in a game since blocks became an official stat in the 1973–74 season. This was also the fifth-best scoring performance in 76ers franchise history. He managed to top 101 total points in less than 24 hours, following up a 42-point, 10-rebound and six-assist performance on November 12 in a 121–109 win over the Atlanta Hawks. On December 11, Embiid had 53 points and 11 rebounds, leading the Philadelphia 76ers to a 131–113 win over the Charlotte Hornets. He became the third player in Sixers history to have multiple 50-point games in the same season, joining Allen Iverson (2000–01 and 2004–05) and Wilt Chamberlain (1965–66 and 1967–68). It is also the 30th game in Embiid's career with 40 points and 10 rebounds. The only other player in franchise history to accomplish that feat was Chamberlain. On December 23, Embiid put up 44 points and seven rebounds in a 119–114 win over the Los Angeles Clippers. He also tied Wilt Chamberlain for the second-most 40-point games in Sixers history. On December 27, Embiid put up 48 points, 11 rebound, three steals, and three blocks in a 116–111 loss to the Washington Wizards. He also surpassed Wilt Chamberlain for the second-most 40-point games in Sixers history. On January 3, Embiid was awarded the Eastern Conference Player of the Month award for his play during the month of December, the fifth of his career, breaking a tie with Allen Iverson for the most such honors in 76ers franchise history. 

On January 28, Embiid recorded 47 points, a season-high 18 rebounds, 5 assists, 3 steals and 2 blocks in a 126–119 win over the Denver Nuggets. He became the second player in franchise history to produce at least four games of 45-plus points, 15-plus rebounds, and five-plus assists, joining Wilt Chamberlain. Embiid also became just the third player in NBA history to record at least 47 points, 18 rebounds, five assists, three steals, and two blocked shots. He joined Hall of Famers Chris Webber (2001/01/05) and Bob McAdoo (1975/03/18) with such games.  For his play in January, Embiid took home the Eastern Conference Player of the Month, the sixth of his career and second in a row. He scored a league-best 34.9 points, 10.7 rebounds, 3.2 assists, 1.0 steals and 1.6 blocks in 10 games during the month. On February 15, Embiid scored his 10,000th career point in a game against the Cleveland Cavaliers. He also surpassed Allen Iverson as the fastest player to reach 10,000 career points in Sixers history, doing so in just 373 games. On February 26, Embiid put up 41 points, 12 rebounds, five assists, and three blocks in a 110–107 loss to the Boston Celtics. He also surpassed Wilt Chamberlain for the most games with at least 40 points, 10 rebounds, and five assists in Sixers history. On March 9, Embiid put up 39 points, seven rebounds, four assists, two steals, three blocks, and a game-winning fadeaway jumpshot in a 120–119 win over the Portland Trail Blazers. On March 18, Embiid put up 31 points, seven rebounds, and seven assists in a 141–121 win over the Indiana Pacers. He also put up his 9th consecutive 30-point game, surpassing Allen Iverson and Wilt Chamberlain for the most consecutive games with at least 30 points in Sixers history.

National team career
Embiid is eligible to compete for Cameroon national basketball team. On 7 February 2017, Embiid was named to the preliminary team to compete in the 2017 FIBA AfroBasket in the Republic of Congo, with the group qualifier taking place in March, during the NBA regular season. Fellow Cameroon-born NBA player Luc Mbah a Moute has voiced his opinion on Embiid representing his country saying, "It would be great for our team, our country and Joel". Embiid ultimately did not compete for Cameroon at AfroBasket 2017.

In July 2022, Embiid was granted citizenship by France as "a foreigner [...] whose naturalization is of exceptional interest". Later in September, he also became a U.S. citizen.

Career statistics

NBA

Regular season

|-
| style="text-align:left;"|
| style="text-align:left;"|Philadelphia
| 31 || 31 || 25.4 || .466 || .367 || .783 || 7.8 || 2.1 || .9 || 2.5 || 20.2
|-
| style="text-align:left;"|
| style="text-align:left;"|Philadelphia
| 63 || 63 || 30.3 || .483 || .308 || .769 || 11.0 || 3.2 || .6 || 1.8 || 22.9
|-
| style="text-align:left;"|
| style="text-align:left;"|Philadelphia
| 64 || 64 || 33.7 || .484 || .300 || .804 || 13.6 || 3.7 || .7 || 1.9 || 27.5
|-
| style="text-align:left;"|
| style="text-align:left;"|Philadelphia
| 51 || 51 || 29.5 || .477 || .331 || .807 || 11.6 || 3.0 || .9 || 1.3 || 23.0
|-
| style="text-align:left;"|
| style="text-align:left;"|Philadelphia
| 51 || 51 || 31.1 || .513 || .377 || .859 || 10.6 || 2.8 || 1.0 || 1.4 || 28.5
|-
| style="text-align:left;"|
| style="text-align:left;"|Philadelphia
| 68 || 68 || 33.8 || .499 || .371 || .814 || 11.7 || 4.2 || 1.1 || 1.5 || style="background:#cfecec;"| 30.6*
|- class"sortbottom"
| style="text-align:center;" colspan="2"|Career
| 328 || 328 || 31.2 || .490 || .338 || .810 || 11.4 || 3.3 || .9 || 1.7 || 26.0
|- class="sortbottom"
| style="text-align:center;" colspan="2"|All-Star
| 5 || 5 || 26.1 || .623 || .440 || .750 || 9.4 || 1.2 || .6 || .8 || 23.8

Playoffs

|-
| style="text-align:left;"|2018
| style="text-align:left;"|Philadelphia
| 8 || 8 || 34.8 || .435 || .276 || .705 || 12.6 || 3.0 || .9 || 1.9 || 21.4
|-
| style="text-align:left;"|2019
| style="text-align:left;"|Philadelphia
| 11|| 11 || 30.4 || .428 || .308 || .822 || 10.5 || 3.4 || .7 || 2.3 || 20.2
|-
| style="text-align:left;"|2020
| style="text-align:left;"|Philadelphia
| 4 || 4 || 36.2 || .459 || .250 || .814 || 12.3 || 1.3 || 1.5 || 1.3 || 30.0
|-
| style="text-align:left;"|2021
| style="text-align:left;"|Philadelphia
| 11 || 11 || 32.4 || .513 || .390 || .835 || 10.5 || 3.4 || 1.0 || 1.5 || 28.1
|-
| style="text-align:left;"|2022
| style="text-align:left;"|Philadelphia
| 10 || 10 || 38.5 || .484 || .212 || .820 || 10.7 || 2.1 || .4 || .8 || 23.6
|- class"sortbottom"
| style="text-align:center;" colspan="2"|Career
| 44 || 44 || 34.1 || .468 || .297 || .806 || 11.1 || 2.8 || .8 || 1.5 || 24.0

College

|-
| style="text-align:left;"|2013–14
| style="text-align:left;"|Kansas
| 28 || 20 || 23.1 || .626 || .200 || .685 || 8.1 || 1.4 || .9 || 2.6 || 11.2

Personal life

Embiid's younger brother, Arthur, died on 16 October 2014 in Cameroon in a car crash. He also has a younger sister. In addition to English, Embiid is fluent in French and Basaa. Embiid has been in a relationship with Brazilian model Anne de Paula since 2018. In September 2020, they had their first child together: a son named Arthur in honor of his late brother.

Embiid is known for his playful personality and social media presence, particularly for his trolling. He is a teetotaler.

Embiid is an avid supporter of Real Madrid CF, frequently posting on Twitter during the team’s matches.

In March 2021, Embiid donated $100,000, his 2021 NBA All-Star Game winnings, to fight homelessness in Philadelphia, for which he received the NBA Cares Community Assist Award in April 2021.

See also

 List of foreign NBA players
 List of NBA annual scoring leaders
 List of NBA All-Stars

Notes

References

External links

 Kansas Jayhawks bio

1994 births
Living people
Basketball players from Yaoundé
Bassa people (Cameroon)
Cameroonian expatriate basketball people in the United States
Cameroonian men's basketball players
Centers (basketball)
Kansas Jayhawks men's basketball players
Montverde Academy alumni
National Basketball Association All-Stars
National Basketball Association players from Cameroon
Philadelphia 76ers draft picks
Philadelphia 76ers players
French men's basketball players